Aleanca për Qytetarin was a coalition for the Albanian local elections of 2011. The alliance consisted of:

See also
Coalition for the Future

References

Democratic Party of Albania
Political party alliances in Albania